George Bernard Shaw: His Plays (1905) is H. L. Mencken's interpretation of G. Bernard Shaw's plays, in which Mencken overwhelmingly embraced the man who was, at that time, his favourite playwright.

According to Mencken: "Through Shaw, I found my vocation at last." It is no surprise that Mencken was enthusiastic in his praise of Shaw when he wrote His Plays, but as time passed, this love would wane, and he would eventually criticize Shaw in a later work Prejudices. Mencken began work on the book in 1904, with the goal of publishing the book under John W. Luce. The body of the book is made up of summaries of Shaw's plays, with minor analysis. The entire book was slightly over 100 pages.

Perhaps the most interesting section of the book is the introduction, where Mencken injects his own personality and beliefs into the work, praising Charles Darwin, Thomas Huxley, and Herbert Spencer – all of whom he insisted influenced Shaw.

Response to the work was mixed, and Mencken made no money at all. In fact, Mencken hoped to meet with Shaw, but his letters went unanswered. Mencken assumed that this was because Shaw disliked the work, but in fact Shaw was moderately impressed – a fact Mencken only discovered years later, while writing Prejudices.

External links
 (hosted by Google Book Search)

1905 books
Books by H. L. Mencken
George Bernard Shaw